The Elwood City Area School District (ECASD) is a diminutive, suburban, public school district located in Beaver County, Pennsylvania and Lawrence County, Pennsylvania. It serves the boroughs of Ellwood City, Ellport, and New Beaver, and the townships of Wayne, and Perry Townships. According to 2000 federal census data, it served a resident population of 14,040. In 2010 the district's population risen to 14,341 people. In 2009, the district residents’ per capita income was $16,554, while the median family income was $42,326. In the Commonwealth, the median family income was $49,501  and the United States median family income was $49,445, in 2010.

Elwood City Area School District operates Lincoln Junior-Senior High School (7th-12th), North Side Primary (K-2nd), Perry Lower Intermediate (3rd-4th), Hartman Intermediate (5th-6th).

Extracurriculars
Ellwood City Area School District offers a variety of clubs, activities and an extensive sports program.

Sports
The district funds:

Boys
Baseball - AA
Basketball- AAA
Cross country - AA
Football - AA
Golf - AA
Soccer - AA
Tennis - AA
Track and field - AA
Wrestling - AA

Girls
Basketball - AAA
Cross country - AA
Golf - AA
Soccer (Fall) - AA
Softball - AAA
Girls' tennis - AA
Track and field - AAA
Volleyball - AA

Junior high school sports

Boys
Baseball
Basketball
Cross country
Football
Track and field
Wrestling	

Girls
Basketball
Cross country
Softball 
Track and field
Volleyball

According to PIAA directory July 2012

References

School districts in Beaver County, Pennsylvania
School districts in Lawrence County, Pennsylvania